Hannah Beard (born 22 August 1988) is an English association football player, who last played for Western Sydney Wanderers in the Australian W-League.

As a youngster Beard turned out for FA Women's Premier League outfit Liverpool Ladies.

Beard was one of two foreign players on Wanderers in 2014.

In 2020, Beard played for the North Shore Mariners.

References

Living people
English women's footballers
Brisbane Roar FC (A-League Women) players
Newcastle Jets FC (A-League Women) players
Western Sydney Wanderers FC (A-League Women) players
Liverpool F.C. Women players
FA Women's National League players
USL W-League (1995–2015) players
A-League Women players
Expatriate women's soccer players in the United States
Expatriate women's soccer players in Australia
1988 births
Women's association football forwards
Los Angeles Strikers players
Australian expatriate sportspeople in the United States